Tajpur may refer to several places in India:

 Tajpur, West Bengal, a city in Purba Medinipur, West Bengal
 Tajpur, Bhongir mandal, a village in Yadadri Bhuvanagiri district, Telangana
 Tajpur, Dildarnagar, a village in Karanda, Uttar Pradesh
 Tajpur, Kapurthala, a village in Punjab
 Tajpur, Bihar, a block in Samastipur district, Bihar
 Tajpur Port, a proposed sea port in Tajpur, West Bengal
 Tajpur Union, a union council in Sylhet District, Bangladesh
 Tajpur, Raebareli, a village in Uttar Pradesh, India

See also 
 Raja Ka Tajpur, a city in Bijnor, Uttar Pradesh